Michael Ohene Asamoah (born 8 November 1996) is a Ghanaian footballer who currently plays as a central midfielder for Ghana Premier League side Cape Coast Ebusua Dwarfs.

Career 
Asamoah started his professional career Medeama in January 2016. On 22 February 2017, he made his debut after coming on in the 57th minute for Amos Korankye during a 1–1 draw against International Allies.

In January 2018, he joined Cape Coast Ebusua Dwarfs. He made his debut on 30 May 2018 after playing the full 90 minutes in a 2–2 draw against rivals Elmina Sharks. On 2 June 2018, he scored his debut goal by scoring the equalizer in a 1–1 draw against Dreams. He only played two matches as the league was cancelled due to the dissolution of the GFA in June 2018, as a result of the Anas Number 12 Expose. During the 2019–20 season, he played 11 league matches and scored a goal before the league cancelled due to the COVID-19 pandemic in Ghana.

References

External links 

 

Living people
1996 births
Association football midfielders
Ghanaian footballers
Ebusua Dwarfs players
Ghana Premier League players